Iolaus nursei is a butterfly in the family Lycaenidae. It is found in south-western Saudi Arabia and Yemen.

References

External links

Die Gross-Schmetterlinge der Erde 13: Die Afrikanischen Tagfalter. Plate XIII 69 b, c

Butterflies described in 1896
Iolaus (butterfly)
Taxa named by Arthur Gardiner Butler